Tad J. Oelstrom (born February 14, 1943) is a retired United States Air Force Lieutenant General who served as the Director of the National Security Program at the John F. Kennedy School of Government, Harvard University.  He also served as the fourteenth Superintendent of the United States Air Force Academy in Colorado Springs, Colorado.

Training and education
Oelstrom was born in Milwaukee, Wisconsin  He graduated from the United States Air Force Academy in 1965 and holds a Master of business administration degree from Auburn University, Alabama. He is a graduate of the U.S. Air Force's Squadron Officer School, Air Command and Staff College, the Industrial College of the Armed Forces and the U.S. Army War College.

Military career
Oelstrom attended pilot training at Vance Air Force Base, Oklahoma, and went on to advanced training in the F-4 Phantom II.  From 1970 to 1971, he was assigned to Da Nang Air Base, South Vietnam.  He has served as commander of the 337th Tactical Fighter Squadron, Seymour Johnson Air Force Base, North Carolina; commander of the 81st Tactical Fighter Wing, RAF Bentwaters, England; commander of the 4404th Composite Wing, Dhahran Air Base, Saudi Arabia; commander of the 86th Fighter Wing, Ramstein Air Base, Germany; and commander of Third Air Force, RAF Mildenhall, England.  Oelstrom held staff positions at Tactical Air Command, United States European Command and United States Central Command.  He also served as an exchange officer with the British Royal Air Force. He retired from active duty on August 1, 2000.

Oelstrom is a command pilot with more than 4,400 flying hours in aircraft including the T-37, T-38, F-4, A-10, F-15 Eagle, F-16 Fighting Falcon and the Hawker Hunter.

Awards and decorations
Oelstrom's decorations include the Air Force Distinguished Service Medal, the Defense Superior Service Medal, the Legion of Merit, the Distinguished Flying Cross with oak leaf cluster, the Meritorious Service Medal with four oak leaf clusters, and the Air Medal with 15 oak leaf clusters.

  Air Force Distinguished Service Medal
  Defense Superior Service Medal
  Legion of Merit
  Distinguished Flying Cross with oak leaf cluster
  Meritorious Service Medal with four oak leaf clusters
  Air Medal with fifteen oak leaf clusters

References

External links

Kennedy School bio

1943 births
Living people
Harvard Kennedy School faculty
United States Air Force Academy alumni
Superintendents of the United States Air Force Academy
United States Air Force generals
United States Air Force personnel of the Vietnam War
Recipients of the Air Force Distinguished Service Medal
Recipients of the Legion of Merit
Recipients of the Distinguished Flying Cross (United States)
Auburn University alumni
Recipients of the Air Medal
Recipients of the Order of the Sword (United States)
Recipients of the Defense Superior Service Medal
United States Air Force personnel of the Gulf War